Viktor Thorn (born 11 May 1996) is a Swedish cross-country skier. He competed in the 2018 Winter Olympics. On 6 April 2021, he announced his retirement from cross-country skiing.

Cross-country skiing results
All results are sourced from the International Ski Federation (FIS).

Olympic Games

World Championships

World Cup

Season standings

References

1996 births
Living people
Cross-country skiers at the 2018 Winter Olympics
Swedish male cross-country skiers
Tour de Ski skiers
Olympic cross-country skiers of Sweden